Sergio Fernández González (born 27 March 1967 in Buenos Aires) is an Argentine rower.

External links 
 
 

1967 births
Living people
Argentine male rowers
Rowers from Buenos Aires
Olympic rowers of Argentina
Rowers at the 1988 Summer Olympics
Rowers at the 1992 Summer Olympics
Rowers at the 1996 Summer Olympics
Rowers at the 2000 Summer Olympics

World Rowing Championships medalists for Argentina
Pan American Games medalists in rowing
Pan American Games gold medalists for Argentina
Pan American Games silver medalists for Argentina
Rowers at the 1995 Pan American Games
Rowers at the 1987 Pan American Games
Rowers at the 1991 Pan American Games
Medalists at the 1995 Pan American Games